Dominique Bidard (born 4 February 1955) is a retired French featherweight weightlifter. He placed 11th at the 1976 Summer Olympics, and 12th–15th at the world championships in 1975 and 1977–1979.

References

1955 births
Living people
French male weightlifters
Olympic weightlifters of France
Weightlifters at the 1976 Summer Olympics
20th-century French people